Secret Story - Casa dos Segredos 2 is the second season of the Portuguese version of the reality show Secret Story, based on the original French version and of Big Brother. The series started on 18 September and will finish on 31 December, lasting 105 days. It is broadcast on TVI and produced by Endemol Portugal. That was the last time that the finale took place in Campo Pequeno, Lisbon.

Housemates
There are 21 housemates for the second season.

Bruna
Bruna is 20 years old. Bruna and Cleide faced the public vote to become the final housemate and a mole for "The Voice". She lost the vote and did not enter the house.

Carlos
He is 28 years old and comes from Maia. He is a hairdresser and is known for his numerous tattoos. He has a son who is 9 years old. He was evicted on Day 50 with 50% of the public vote against João J. (27%) and Marco (23%).
Secret: We are a fake couple (with Daniela S.,discovered).

Cátia
She is 22 years old and comes from Portimão. She is a medical auxiliary. She wants to enter the world of television.
Secret: I worked in a cabaret (discovered)

Cleide
She is 23 years old and comes from Barcelos. She is a trainee lawyer. She also already did some model work and worked as a DJ.
Secret: I am the accomplice of "A Voz". (discovered)

Daniela P.
She is 25 years old and comes from Lisbon. She is a singer and actress and already did some model work. Daniela P. also practices martial arts and plays soccer. She entered as a couple with Pedro but eventually, they broke up inside the house.
Secret: We are a real couple. (with Pedro, discovered)

Daniela S.
She is 33 years old is a psychologist and comes from Torres Vedras. She has a daughter who is 5 years old. She likes to motocross and says that her main objective is victory. She has the current record of most secrets discovered by a housemate of both the first and the second session (three secrets uncovered).
Secret: We are a fake couple. (with Carlos, discovered)

Delphine
She is 19 years old and comes from Caminha. She dances hip hop and practised ballet for many years, but stopped due to an injury. She plays five instruments. She was evicted on Day 8 with 70% of the vote to evict.
Secret: I am studying to be a nun.

Fanny
She is 19 years old and lives in Switzerland. She is a dentist's assistant. She'd like to be a medical examiner. She wants to take part in the adventure and the challenge.
Secret: I am a compulsive consumer. (discovered)

Filipe
He is 31 years old and comes from Portalegre. He is a trainee lawyer, but he liked to be a writer. He says he has a bohemian lifestyle and he practices four sports. He said he has two challenges in the house: to discover secrets and to survive a public vote. He was evicted on day 15 with 45% of the public vote to evict against Sónia and João F.
Secret: I was saved by a miracle.

João F.
He is 26 years old and comes from Valongo. He is a security system technician. He likes to go to the gym and to swim and practice soccer. He would like to enter the world of television. He entered with his girlfriend, Sónia. He was evicted on day 29 with 61% of the public vote against João M.
Secret: We are a real couple. (with Sónia).

João J.
He is 26 years old and comes from Proença-a-Nova. He is an industrial commissioner in his father's granite and basalt factory. He likes to hunt and to fish, he plays the accordion and he dances folklore. He also likes to go to the gym.
Secret: I'm virgin (discovered).

João M.
He is 20 years old and comes from Albufeira. He is a management student. He was already national runner-up of Muay Thai. He goes to the gym every day and likes to maintain a healthy alimentation.
Secret: I was a victim of domestic violence. (discovered)

Marco
He is 21 years old and comes from Amadora. He is a confectioner. He likes to go to the gym and the cinema. He was automatically nominated on Week 5 for his aggressive behaviour. He entered with his ex-girlfriend, Susana. She had ended their relationship because she doesn't want to have kids, one of Marco's wishes.
Secret: We are an ex-couple. (with Susana, discovered)

Miguel
He is 23 years old and he is a psychologist. He says he likes to go to the gym twice a day. He likes his looks and he wants to be the cover of a fitness magazine.
Secret: I am the daughter/son of a Bishop

Nádia
She is 21 years old and comes from Queluz. She was a rebellious teenager, but she maintained a good relationship with her parents. She said she is manipulative and a good player. She walked on Day 10 because she missed her friends and family.
Secret: My ex-boyfriend paid me for sex.

Paulo
He is 26 years old and comes from Lisbon. He practices jiu-jitsu. He assumes himself as a leader and a player. In the house, he is known for his pranks.
Secret: I killed a man.

Pedro
He is 27 years old. He is a bank employee, barman and is studying consumer sciences. He said he was diagnosed with polyamory. He entered with his girlfriend, Daniela P. but they ended their relationship in the house. He was evicted on Day 36 with 37% of the public vote against Marco(31%), Carlos(26%) and Paulo (6%).
Secret: We are a real couple. (with Daniela P.)

Ricardo
He is 23 years old and he is a confectioner. He has reggae and a rap band. He wants to be a psychologist and a sociologist. He considers himself a giant (1.96m) with a good heart.
Secret: I envision death

Sónia
Is 29 years old and comes from Vila Nova de Gaia. She is a teacher of Art History.  She liked to be a fashion designer and loves theater, cinema, photography, music and painting. Often paint and photograph. She likes to keep up with new trends in fashion. Her greatest dream was to live in Italy. 
Secret: We are a real couple. (with João F., discovered)

Susana
She is 31 years old and comes from Portimão. She is a striptease dancer. She was a soldier for 4 years. She has made many plastic surgeries and she doesn't marry and have kids. She ended her relationship with her ex-boyfriend, Marco, because of this. She entered the house with him.
Secret: We are an ex-couple (with Marco, discovered).

Teresa
She is 21 years old and comes from Coimbra. She is a student of tourism. She works at night so she can pay for her studies. She wants to be on the show for money, as she has financial difficulties. She was evicted on Day 43 with 75% of the public vote against Daniela P. 
Secret: I was abandoned by my parents when I was 6 years old. (discovered)

Secrets
There are 16 secrets in the House for this second season.

Nominations table
Nominations follow a different formula than its typical of the Big Brother franchise. Each week the nominations alternated: male housemates nominate female housemates one week, and female housemates nominate male housemates the following week. Also, during some weeks, twist occur which affect the nomination procedure.

Notes

Nominations totals received

Nominations: Results

Ratings
Eviction shows took place on Sundays.

External links
Official Website (Portuguese)

2011 Portuguese television seasons
02